Windsong's Legacy was a Standardbred trotting horse who won the Triple Crown of Harness Racing for Trotters in 2004, capturing the Hambletonian, Yonkers Trot and Kentucky Futurity titles.  The horse was trained and driven by Trond Smedshammer.  He became the first trotter since Super Bowl in 1972 to win the Triple Crown. He died early in 2008 from heart failure at the age of seven, after siring three foal crops.

References

2001 racehorse births
2008 racehorse deaths
American Standardbred racehorses
Triple Crown of Harness Racing winners
Hambletonian Stakes winners
Yonkers Trot winners
Kentucky Futurity winners
Racehorses bred in the United States
Racehorses trained in the United States
United States Harness Racing Hall of Fame inductees